A blood sport or bloodsport is a category of sport or entertainment that involves bloodshed. Common examples of the former include combat sports such as cockfighting and dog fighting, and some forms of hunting and fishing. Activities characterized as blood sports, but involving only human participants, include the Ancient Roman gladiatorial games.

Etymology 

According to Tanner Carson, the earliest use of the term is in reference to mounted hunting, where the quarry would be actively chased, as in fox hunting or hare coursing. Before firearms a hunter using arrows or a spear might also wound an animal, which would then be chased and perhaps killed at close range, as in medieval boar hunting. The term was popularised by author Henry Stephens Salt.

Later, the term seems to have been applied to various kinds of baiting and forced combat: bull-baiting, bear-baiting, cockfighting, and later developments such as dog fighting and rat-baiting. The animals were specially bred for fighting. In the Victorian era, social reformers began a vocal opposition to such activities, claiming grounds of ethics, morality and animal welfare.

Current issues

Online videos 
Many online video-sharing websites such as YouTube do not allow videos of animal bloodsports to be shown on the site.

Animal fighting 

Limitations on blood sports have been enacted in much of the world. Certain blood sports remain legal under varying degrees of control in certain locations (e.g., bullfighting and cockfighting) but have declined in popularity elsewhere. Proponents of blood sports are widely cited to believe that they are traditional within the culture. Bullfighting aficionados, for example, do not regard bullfighting as a sport but as a cultural activity. It is sometimes called a tragic spectacle, because in many forms of the event, the bull is invariably killed and the bullfighter is always at risk of death.

Hunting and recreational fishing 

Animal rights and animal welfare advocates have extended the term blood sport to various types of hunting. Trophy hunting and fox hunting in particular have been disparaged as blood sports by those concerned about animal welfare, animal ethics and conservation.

Recreational fishing has sometimes been described as a blood sport by those within the recreation.

In fiction 

Blood sports have been a common theme in fiction. While historical fiction depicts real-life sports such as gladiatorial games and jousting, speculative fiction, not least dystopic science fiction suggests variants of blood sports in a contemporary or future society. Some popular works themed on blood sports are Battle Royale, The Hunger Games, The Running Man, The Long Walk, Fight Club, Death Race 2000, Amores Perros, Squid Game, Bloodsport, and The Most Dangerous Game. Blood sports are also a common setting for video games (Apex Legends, Danganronpa, Street Fighter, Mortal Kombat etc.), making up much of the fighting game genre.

Developed science fiction universes such as Star Wars and Doctor Who feature different blood sports.

List of blood sports

Human-human

Human-animal

Animal-animal

See also 
 Animals in sport
 Damnatio ad bestias
 Illegal sports

References

Further reading 
 Don Atyeo, Blood and Guts: Violence in Sports, Grosset & Dunlap, 1979. 
 Podcast: Cage fighting and the rise of the UFC

Animal rights
Animal welfare
 
Pejorative terms
Cruelty to animals